Oregon Route 11 is an Oregon state highway that runs between the city of Pendleton in eastern Oregon, to the Washington border south of Walla Walla, Washington.  OR 11 traverses the Oregon–Washington Highway No. 8 of the Oregon state highway system, even though there are numerous other highways crossing the Oregon–Washington border.  The route shares a concurrency with U.S. Route 30 along the Pendleton Highway No. 67.  It is one of several Oregon state highways to terminate at one of Oregon's borders.

Route description

OR 11 begins (at its southern terminus) at a junction with Interstate 84 in Pendleton.  While in Pendleton, it overlaps U.S. Route 30 for a short distance, before leaving the city heading in a north-northeasterly direction, along the base of the Blue Mountains, passing near the communities of Havana and Blakeley and through the cities of Adams and Athena.  

Just north of Milton-Freewater, OR 11 ends at the Washington state line. The route continues into Washington as State Route 125. SR 125 continues north into Walla Walla.

History
While only  today, OR 11 once ran from the Washington to the California borders.  However, in 1935 much of the original route of OR 11 was redesignated as U.S. Route 395, which heads northwest from Pendleton towards the Tri-Cities.

Major intersections

References

External links
 ORoads: Oregon Highway 11

011
Transportation in Umatilla County, Oregon
Pendleton, Oregon
1932 establishments in Oregon